ALAFCO (Aviation Lease and Finance Company) is an aircraft-leasing company, founded in Kuwait in 1992. The CEO is Adel Ahmad Albanwan. It is jointly owned by the Kuwait Finance House, Gulf Investment Corporation and Kuwait Airways. Its lease terms are Islamic economical jurisprudence-compliant.

Customers
ALAFCO's customers include Royal Jordanian, Malaysia Airlines, Garuda Indonesia, Air Europa, Turkish Airlines, China Eastern Airlines, Pakistan International Airlines, Yemenia, Air India, China Southern Airlines, Sky Airlines, Saudi Arabian Airlines, Sun Country Airlines, VietJet Air, Jet2.com, and GoAir.

Future planned leases include six 787s for Oman Air.

Fleet
In October 2006, ALAFCO was planning to increase its fleet to 80 aircraft by 2015, up from the current 18. After growing from 26 to 40 in 2010, Its fleet was reported as 70 aircraft in January 2020.

In April 2020, ALAFCO sued Boeing for $336 million in Chicago federal court, accusing it of refusing to return advance payments on an order of 737 MAX planes (which were grounded worldwide) which it had cancelled the previous month. It later withdrew the suit, agreeing to order 20 instead of the planned 40.

Announced fleet expansions

See also

 Commercial Aircraft Sales and Leasing
 Option (aircraft purchasing)

References

External links
 ALAFCO website

Aircraft leasing companies